Senator Foreman or Forman may refer to:
 
Dan Foreman (born 1953), Idaho State Senate
Ferris Foreman (1808–1901), Illinois State Senate
L. J. Forman (1855–1933), West Virginia Senate
William St. John Forman (1847–1908), Illinois State Senate